The California Outside Music Association (a.k.a. COMA) was a nonprofit music presenter and networking organization operating in the Los Angeles area from 1983 until 1991. The organization is best known for producing the album A Beginner’s Guide to COMA and a series of festivals called Day of Music. Founded by Titus Levi and Eric Potruch, COMA officially launched on March 3, 1983, when the two founders passed out a flyer describing COMA’s planned activities. This flyer came to be known as The COMA Manifesto. COMA's goals included bringing an eclectic scope of artists from diverse genres, for concerts and festivals.
Genres included (but were not limited to) jazz, jazz rock, progressive rock, experimental 20th century compositions, ambient music music-concrete, free-jazz, post-rock improvisation, experimental rap, and multicultural/trans-cultural experiments.

COMA produced its first live performance event in July 1983 at a small art gallery in Downtown Long Beach. The format of the concert would form the template of the Day of Music events: solo performers and small ensembles playing sequentially over several hours. In this case, the performances started at noon and ended at 10:00 PM. At the Day of Music events, which launched in 1988, events started at noon and ran until midnight. They took place in multiple venues in the Pine Avenue area of Downtown Long Beach, including the gallery-café-performance space System M, a restaurant called Mum’s, and multiple gallery spaces on Pine Avenue, Broadway, and Third Street in Downtown Long Beach. In 1985 the group produced a full-length LP on Rotary Totem Records called A Beginner’s Guide to COMA. This ten-song disc included music from a number of rock-leaning performers, including Dogma Probe, Elma Mayer, Tao Mao, The Underpeople, Mark Soden, The Motor Totemist Guild, Cartoon, Newcross, 5UUs, and Rhythm Plague.

The activities and impact of COMA have been documented in at least two research papers, Jarle Glesåen Storløkken’s COMA - American avant rock: a study of the music of avant rock bands and Charles Sharp’s book-length dissertation Improvisation, Identity, and Tradition: Experimental Music Communities in Los Angeles.

Discography
A Beginner’s Guide to COMA 1985, Rotary Totem Records, RTR-LP-003

Members and affiliates

5uu's
Josh Adelson
Ken Ando
Bonnie Barnett
Bazooka
Guy Bennett
Joseph Berardi
Alex Cline
Nels Cline
Cruel Frederick
Mike Demers
Karl Denson
Richard Derrick
Tom Dougherty
Brad Dutz
False Dimitri
Ken Filiano
The Fnords
Ron George
Vinny Golia
James Grigsby
Richard Grossman
Greg Harris
Emily Hay
Lynn Johnston
Darrell Jónsson
Jason Kahn
Kaoru
Dave Karasony
Dave Kerman
Elise Kermani
Virtus Kerny
Bob Mair
Manufacturing of Humidifiers
Goucho Marks
Elma Mayer
Dean Myerson
NEEF
Jim Nightingale
Non Credo
Jim Norman
PFS
Paper Bag
Papa’s Midnight Hop
Wayne Peet
Bill Plake
Eric Potruch
David Poyourow
Tim Quinn
Rena
John Reager
Ken Rosser
B.B. Russell
Vicki Silbert
Mark Soden
G.E. Stinson
Carl Stone
SubMedia
Tao Mao
Horace Tapscott
Ed Toomey
Trio Search and Seizure
Universal Congress Of
Chuck Turner 
Michael Vlatkovich
Kira Vollman
Rich West
Curt Wilson
Brent Wilcox
Walter Zooi

Venues

Club Lhasa
Anti-Club
Safari Sam's
KXLU Radio
Helen's Place
System M/M Bar
Mums
James Armstrong Theatre
KCRW Radio
Art Matrix
Long Beach Public Library Auditorium
Hop Singh's
Beyond Baroque Literary Arts Center
KPFK Radio

References

Sources

 Sharp, Charles M. Improvisation, identity and tradition: Experimental music communities in Los Angeles. Ph.D.   dissertation, University of California, Los Angeles, 2008.
 Storløkken, Jarle Glesåen. COMA - American avant rock: a study of the music of avant rock bands Thinking Plague,Motor Totemist Guild, U Totem and 5UU's and their relationship with 1970s progressive rock. Master’s thesis, University of Oslo, Norway, 2008.

Press

 Goings On Santa Barbara A Humdinger; Day of Music features one event designed to bathe participants in sound. LEO SMITH. Los Angeles Times May 23, 1991
 GOINGS ON SANTA BARBARA Chalking It Up; Santa Barbara's Italian Street Painting Festival brings 200 artists and children to their knees. LEO SMITH. Los Angeles Times May 24, 1990. p. 16
 It's music, music, everywhere in Long Beach // PREVIEW: Day of Music organizer Moins Rastgar keeps the city grooving with a lineup of more than two dozen local groups. [MORNING Edition] BEN WENER: The Orange County Register. Orange County Register. Santa Ana, Calif.: Sep 29, 1995. p. 54
 Fusion fans might favor a triple-bill; [EVENING Edition] Anne Valdespino:The Orange County Register. Orange County Register. Santa Ana, Calif.: Sep 13, 1990. p. K.02
 Riffs; [EVENING Edition] Cary Darling:The Register. Orange County Register. Santa Ana, Calif.: Sep 10, 1989. p. L.22
 Riffs; [EVENING Edition] Cary Darling:The Register. Orange County Register. Santa Ana, Calif.: Oct 9, 1988. p. j.22
 CRITIC'S CHOICE: POP MUSIC; [EVENING Edition] Jim Washburn:The Register. Orange County Register. Santa Ana, Calif.: Mar 4, 1988. p. 37
 New Work Performed on New Instruments; Composer: Ron George plays his music on his own inventions... CHRIS PASLES TIMES STAFF WRITER June 1, 1990

External links
Jarle Glesåen Storløkken’s COMA - American avant rock: a study of the music of avant rock bands  http://www.duo.uio.no/sok/work.html?WORKID=74131âŒ©=en 
Dogma Probe http://www.dogmaprobe.com
Rotary Totem Records http://www.rotarytotem.com/
NEEF (a group that performed in early COMA shows) http://www.myspace.com/neefmusic
Ragazzi Interview with Dave Kerman (discusses early COMA) https://web.archive.org/web/20081204022809/http://www.ragazzi-music.de/interviews/kermandave_eng.html
Dave Kerman’s webpage: http://www.generalrubric.com/dkerman/splash.html
Vinny Golia’s homepage: http://www.vinnygolia.com/
Nels Cline: http://www.nelscline.com/
Guy Bennett: http://www.guybennett.com/
Elma Mayer’s bio at Some Phil Records: https://archive.today/20130203080806/http://www.somephil.com/artists/elma.html
Steuart Liebig: https://web.archive.org/web/20100702041323/http://www.stigsite.com/
Paper Bag (now Bag Theory): https://web.archive.org/web/20100421054837/http://www.paperbagtheory.com/paperbag/index.htm
PFS on ProgArchives http://www.progarchives.com/artist.asp?id=2994

Organizations based in California
Music organizations based in the United States